Johnny Foreigner/Stagecoach is a split EP between Johnny Foreigner and Stagecoach. Released on November 15, 2010 through Alcopop! Records it features an original track from both bands as well as another track in which both bands perform a cover song of each other's songs and was limited to 500 copies.

Track listing

Personnel
Johnny Foreigner
 Alexei Berrow - vocals/guitar
 Kelly Southern - vocals/bass
 Junior Elvis Washington Laidley  - drums/vocals

Stagecoach
 Luke Barham - vocals/guitar
 Nick Tanner - lead guitar
 John Harrington - bass guitar/vocals
 Tom 'Chop' Lewis - mandolin/vocals
 Matt Emery - drums/vocals

References

2010 EPs
Split EPs
Alcopop! Records EPs
Johnny Foreigner albums